Daniel Norouzi (born 3 January 1992) is a Danish professional footballer who plays as a defensive midfielder for FC Helsingør.

Early and personal life
Norouzi was born in Copenhagen. He also holds Iranian nationality.

Career

Club career
He came through the youth ranks of Brøndby, and was team captain during his youth team years.

He was promoted to the Brøndby senior team in Autumn 2011, but shoulder and knee injuries prevented his debut. Norouzi found himself third in the left back pecking-order, behind Danish international Thomas Rasmussen and Jan Frederiksen. In the Winter break of the 2011-12 Danish Superliga season, Rasmussen left the club, while Frederiksen sustained an injury, and Norouzi was poised to claim the left back position as his own. Norouzi made his senior debut in March 2012, and played 12 of 15 games in the second half of the 2011-12 Superliga season.

He signed a season-long loan contract with Vejle Boldklub in July 2013.

He signed a one-year contract with Iranian club Sepahan on 16 June 2016. However, due to Iranian military rules, he could not get the permission to play in the Persian Gulf Pro League. On 7 August 2016, he ended his contract with Sepahan.

International career
Norouzi made his youth international debut for the Denmark national under-16 football team in September 2007. He played his first competitive international game in the 2009 UEFA European Under-17 Football Championship qualifying round in September 2008.

He has played a total of 31 games for various Danish national youth teams, including two games for the Denmark national under-20 football team.

Norouzi was born to Iranian parents and is eligible to play for the Iran national football team.

Playing style
Norouzi was described by first club Brøndby as an aggressive left back.

References

1992 births
Living people
Danish men's footballers
Brøndby IF players
Vejle Boldklub players
Sepahan S.C. footballers
Danish Superliga players
Danish 1st Division players
Association football fullbacks
Danish people of Iranian descent
Sportspeople of Iranian descent
Footballers from Copenhagen